Pohorje can be:

 Pohorje - mountain range in Slovenia.

Settlement 
 Hočko Pohorje, Hoče–Slivnica municipality
 Slivniško Pohorje, Hoče–Slivnica municipality
 Pohorje, Cirkulane, Cirkulane municipality